List of Guggenheim Fellowships awarded in 1965

See also
 Guggenheim Fellowship

References

1965
1965 awards